Diplo (born 1978) is the stage name of Thomas Wesley Pentz, an American DJ, producer and songwriter.

Diplo may also refer to:

 Diplo (album), by Diplo, 2022
 Diplo, Sindh, Pakistan
 DiploFoundation, or simply Diplo, an international non-profit foundation
 Ramón Rivero (1909–1956), Puerto Rican actor, comedian and composer known by the mononym Diplo

Other uses
 Le Monde diplomatique, an international monthly publication nicknamed Le Diplo

See also
 
 Duplo, a version of Lego designed for toddlers